Hensodon spinosus is an extinct pycnodontid that lived during the Upper Cenomanian of what is now Lebanon.  H. spinosus superficially resembled a marine angelfish with a massive head, and a very spiny pectoral girdle.  Different specimens have different arrangements of the horn-like frontal spines.  One form has the horns arranged as a double-prong, assumed to be the male, and the other form, assumed to be the female, having the horns one after the other, like those of a rhinoceros.

References

Pycnodontiformes genera
Late Cretaceous fish
Late Cretaceous fish of Asia